The ATOM Awards are a group of awards offered to Australian and New Zealand "professionals, educators and students", honoring achievements in the making of film, television,  multimedia, and from 2007 multi-modal productions.

The Awards were established in the year 1982 by the Australian Teachers of Media, "an independent, non-profit association to promote media education and screen literacy in primary, secondary and tertiary education and the broader community".

Awards are now offered in 36 different categories as of 2005, broken down into awards for students, tertiary students, educational resources, and general. There is also a teacher's award. This Award is made at the discretion of the judges, and recognizes the commitment, dedication and inspiration of a teacher or school, and which the judges can observe informing a body of student work as submitted in either the primary, secondary or tertiary categories of the ATOM Awards. The Teachers’ Award can neither be sought nor applied for, and is given solely at the judges’ discretion.

The awards attract student filmmakers, educational films, and even professional industry practitioners.  This makes it one of the only awards of its kind.

Entries are open to Australian and New Zealand students and media industry professionals.

2007 ATOM Awards categories 

Schools

 Best Junior (K-8) Film Video Production. (includes music clips, short drama, documentaries, experimental) 
 Best Junior (K-8) Multimedia Production 
 Best Senior (9-12) Multimedia Production. (Multimedia production: combination of image, text, audio, video & interactivity) 
 Best Secondary Animation (claymation, drawing, cell 2D & 3D) 
 Best Secondary Documentary 
 Images of Age Sub-category (open to Vic residents only)*
 Best Secondary Fiction 
 Best Secondary Music Video

Tertiary, A production made by a student or individual enrolled at a tertiary or TAFE institution at the time of the production

 Best Short Fiction 
 Best Experimental 
 Best Documentary 
 Images of Age Sub-category (open to Vic residents only)*
 Best Animation 
 Best Music Video 
 Best Multimedia (includes web)
 Best Interactive Game

General

 Best Short Fiction (50 minutes or less) 
 Best Experimental 
 Best Animation 
 Best Music Video 
 Best Children's Television Series 
 Best Multi-modal production†
 Best Documentary Short Form (30 minutes or less) 
 Best Documentary General 
 Images of Age Sub-category (open to Vic residents only)*
 Best Documentary Social & Political Issues 
 Best Documentary Science, Technology & The Environment 
 Best Documentary Human Story 
 Best Multimedia (inc. installations and web)
 Best Interactive Game

Educational/Vocational

These category entries will be judged cross platform. Judges will be assessing best teaching/training practice, methodology, suitability to the audience, delivery and content. These entries may be websites, TV programs, videos, film, DVD, CD-ROMs or a convergence of the above, including installations.

 Best Primary Education Resource 
 Best Secondary Education Resource 
 Best Tertiary Education Resource 
 Best Instructional/training Resource 
 Best Multimedia Learning Reference (includes web)
 Best Multi-modal production†
 Best Indigenous Resource

Notable past ATOM Award nominees and winners 

Ibrahim
 (Ivan Gaal, Rob McCubbin production; Ivan Gaal direction, Tony Lintermans writing)
 ATOM Best Social Issues Award 1986
 ATOM Children's Award, Australian Section 1986
Hunt Angels
Hunt Angels Productions
ATOM Award winner 2006
The Mysterious Geographic Explorations of Jasper Morello
2005 Academy Award nominee
(Anthony Lucas, 3D Films)
ATOM Award winner 2005
Noah & Saskia
(ACTF)
ATOM Award winner 2005
Adam Elliot
2003 Academy Award winner 
ATOM Award winner 1998
Wildness
(Big and Little Films in association with Film Australia)
ATOM Award winner 2004
The 20 Cent Quest
ATOM Award winner 2003
A Wedding in Ramallah
(Sherine Salama, Habibi Films)
ATOM Award winner 2003
Gulpilil – One Red Blood
(Darlene Johnson, JOTZ Productions)
Martha's New Coat
(Rachel Ward, New Town Films)
ATOM Award winner 2003
Harry’s War
(Richard Frankland, Golden Seahorse Productions)
Tulip
(Rachel Griffiths)
ATOM Award Nominee 1999
Wicked Science
(Jonathan M Shiff Productions)
ATOM Award winner 2004
Round the Twist
(ACTF)
FrontLine
(Working Dog Productions)
ATOM Award Winner 1998

See also
 List of television awards

References

External links 
 ATOM Film, Television and Multimedia Awards ATOM Award website
 AFC NewsAndEvents Australian Film Commission description of the 2004 Awards, including finalists
 Australian Teachers of Media ATOM official website
 ATOM Awards Entry Form download ATOM Awards Call for entries here
 "ATOM's reach spreads" 2002 article in The Age newspaper

Australian film awards
Australian television awards
Video game awards
Awards established in 1982
1982 establishments in Oceania